Kotovsky (masculine), Kotovskaya (feminine), or Kotovskoye (neuter) is the name of several rural localities in Russia:
Kotovsky, Kemerovo Oblast, a settlement in Svyatoslavskaya Rural Territory of Izhmorsky District of Kemerovo Oblast
Kotovsky, Novoderevenkovsky District, Oryol Oblast, a village in Novoderevenkovsky District of the Oryol region
Kotovsky, Serafimovichsky District, Volgograd Oblast, a khutor in Bolshovsky Selsoviet of Serafimovichsky District of Volgograd Oblast
Kotovsky, Uryupinsky District, Volgograd Oblast, a khutor in Kotovsky Selsoviet of Uryupinsky District of Volgograd Oblast
Kotovskoye, a selo in Kotovsky Selsoviet of Rasskazovsky District of Tambov Oblast
Kotovskaya, a village in Moshinsky Selsoviet of Nyandomsky District of Arkhangelsk Oblast